Hyblaea tenebrionis is a moth in the family Hyblaeidae described by Cajetan Felder, Rudolf Felder and Alois Friedrich Rogenhofer in 1874.

References

Hyblaeidae